Michael Trent is an American musician from Denver. He performs as a solo act and in the band Shovels & Rope since 2008.

Career
Trent first performed as the lead singer in the Denver, Colorado band Tinker's Punishment, before moving to the Southeast and renaming as The Films with Kenneth Harris, Jacob Sinclair and Adam Blake in Charleston, South Carolina. The group disbanded in 2010.

Trent collaborated with Butch Walker, performing on two of his albums. He then released two solo albums.

Trent recorded an album as a duo with his wife, Cary Ann Hearst, in 2008. The pair then formed the group Shovels and Rope and began touring, performing about 200 shows each year.  In 2012 the couple released a second album, "O Be Joyful"

Discography

Solo studio albums

Credits

References 

Living people
American folk singers
Year of birth missing (living people)
People from Denver
Musicians from Charleston, South Carolina